Ichabod and Me is an American situation comedy television series starring Robert Sterling and George Chandler that aired in the United States during the 1961–1962 television season. It depicts the life of a New York City newspaper reporter who moves to a small New England town and becomes the publisher of its newspaper.

Premise

Tiring of life in New York City, where he had worked as a reporter at the New York Times, and wanting to raise his six-year-old son Benjie in a different environment, 44-year-old widower Bob Major moves with Benjie to Phippsboro, a small, sleepy rural town in New Hampshire with a population of about 3,000, where he purchases the town's only newspaper, the weekly Phippsboro Bulletin, from its longtime owner and editor, Ichabod Adams. Bob's big-city attitudes and ideas often clash with the small-town ways of the natives of Phippsboro, who are stereotypical rural New Englanders – taciturn, frugal, suspicious of strangers like him, and set in their ways; he is prone to writing inflammatory editorials in the Bulletin calling for progress in the town to bring it into the mid-20th century and raising the ire of the townspeople, who tend to oppose change. Ichabod – who is in his 60s, owns most of the town and serves it in many capacities, including as its mayor for the past 28 years, its school superintendent, and its traffic commissioner — remains involved in the operation of the newspaper. Ichabod is bemused by Bob and friendly toward him, offering him fatherly wisdom and advising him on how to navigate conflicts with his neighbors.

Also in Bob's life in Phippsboro are Ichabod's adult daughter Abby, who lives with Ichabod and at first views the highly eligible Bob with disdain, but then warms to him, takes a romantic interest in him, and eventually becomes his girlfriend; Aunt Livvy, the stern-faced but soft-hearted housekeeper for Bob and Benjie; Jonathan Baylor, a wide-eyed high school student who is Bob's only regular employee at the Phippsboro Bulletin; and Olaf, one of the townspeople. Martin Perkins, a typically taciturn New Englander who runs the local hardware store, and his friend Colby, the owner and operator of Colby's Seed and Fertilizer, are longtime Phippsboro residents who serve on the city council and share a suspicion of Bob and his activities. Bob complains about how hard it is to keep a secret in Phippsboro, where residents – Martin and Colby in particular – listen in on the town's party line to eavesdrop on other people's business.

Cast
Robert Sterling...Robert "Bob" Major 
George Chandler...Ichabod Adams
Christine White...Abigail "Abby" Adams
Jimmy Mathers...Benjamin "Benjie" Major (recurring)
Reta Shaw...Aunt Lavinia ("Livvy") (recurring)
Guy Raymond...Martin Perkins (recurring)
Forrest Lewis...Colby (recurring)
Jimmy Hawkins...Jonathan Baylor
Burt Mustin...Olaf (recurring)

The pilot "Adam's Apples", aired in 1960, had a somewhat different cast.   Fred Beir played Terrence "Terry" Major, later recast and renamed Bob Major for the actual series.  Dorothy Neumann played Aunt Lavinia ("Livvy"), and Pitt Herbert played Martin Perkins.  Burt Mustin, who played the recurring role of Olaf in the series, played a character called Burt in the pilot.  Chandler and White appeared in the pilot in their series roles.

Origins

George Chandler created the Ichabod Adams character in 1956 in "Goodbye, Grey Flannel," an episode of the dramatic series Robert Montgomery Presents, with Lee Bowman co-starring as "Mr. Major", a forerunner of the Bob Major character of Ichabod and Me. The success of the episode prompted Chandler to return as Ichabod in a 1957 episode of Robert Montgomery Presents entitled "One Smart Apple."

The two Robert Montgomery Presents episodes led to the filming of a pilot for Ichabod and Me entitled "Adam's Apples." It included George Chandler as Ichabod and Christine White as his daughter Abby, but differed from the regular series in several ways. In "Adam's Apples," a character named Terrence "Terry" Major, portrayed by Fred Beir, gives up life as an advertising executive in New York City and retires to Phippsboro to become a gentleman farmer, and he rents property from Ichabod. Terry is childless, but has a dog named Fownes, after his former boss in New York. Dorothy Neumann portrays Livvy, Pitt Herbert portrays Martin Perkins, and Burt Mustin appears as a character named Burt rather than Olaf. The pilot does not include the Jonathan Baylor, Benjie Major, or Colby characters and makes no mention of Phippsboro's newspaper. It aired in April 1960 as an episode of General Electric Theater but did not sell as a regular series.

Despite the pilot's failure, Chandler felt strongly about getting a regular series on the air based on the Ichabod Adams and "Mr. Major" characters.
He took the initiative in forming a partnership with co-creators Joe Connelly and Bob Mosher and with comedian Jack Benny, whose production company put up much of the funding for the regular series Ichabod and Me. The show's premise was retooled for the regular series, with a character named Bob Major giving up life as a newspaper reporter in New York and moving to Phippsboro with his son Benjie, where he purchases the local newspaper from Ichabod, with Robert Sterling rather than Beir playing the role of Bob. With the success of The Andy Griffith Show, a rural-themed CBS situation comedy which began its long and successful run during the 1960–1961 season, and the planned premiere on CBS in the 1961–1962 season of Window on Main Street starring Robert Young — which some observers viewed as bearing similarities to Ichabod and Me — CBS saw a potentially successful series in Ichabod and Me and picked it up for its 1961–1962 schedule.

Production
A low-key situation comedy, Ichabod and Me was created and produced by Joe Connelly and Bob Mosher — who served as its executive producers – in association with Jack Benny's JaMco Productions, and Irving Paley served as series producer. It was co-sponsored by the Quaker Oats Company and the Kent and York Imperial-Sized Cigarette brands of the P. Lorillard Tobacco Company.

Both the pilot and the regular series were filmed at Revue Studios in Hollywood, California. The show was in black and white with a laugh track. Hank Simms was the show's announcer.

Pete Rugolo and His Orchestra performed the opening and closing theme of Ichabod and Me, which was an updated, uptempo arrangement of the traditional folk song "The Girl I Left Behind Me" — a fife-and-drum-corps classic which connoted the American Revolutionary War era in New England. It appeared with the title "Ichabod and Me Theme" as a track on Rugolo's 1962 album TV's Top Themes.

Jimmy Mathers, who portrayed Benjie Major, was the brother of Jerry Mathers, who starred in Leave It to Beaver at the time. However, the Benjie and Livvy roles were rather minor ones in Ichabod and Me, and the two characters did not even appear in a number of episodes.

Ichabod and Me′s most noteworthy guest star was screenwriter, playwright, television producer, narrator, and television host Rod Serling, who had gained fame in the 1950s for his live television dramas and as creator of the anthology series The Twilight Zone, which had debuted in 1959. He portrayed a reclusive counterculture novelist in the episode "The Celebrity," which aired on March 20, 1962, in what CBS billed as his dramatic debut. Uncomfortable with acting, Serling said of his appearance on Ichabod and Me, "I never had a line that resembled the English language."

Reception

The Red Skelton Show drew high ratings and appealed especially to rural audiences, and CBS hoped it would provide a good lead-in for Ichabod and Me, so it scheduled Ichabod and Me to follow The Red Skelton Show. Ichabod and Me met with poor critical reviews that suggested such scheduling would not succeed in building an audience for the series. In her column of September 27, 1961, Associated Press television critic Cynthia Lowry wrote that Ichabod and Me amounted to a "pretty tired, clumsy effort" and offered the opinion that its stereotyped depiction of rural New Englanders was more likely to offend residents of New England than attract them to the show. The same day, syndicated columnist Harriet Van Horne wrote of CBS that "A network that would buy Ichabod for prime evening time would buy the Brooklyn Bridge from a tavern drunk — and pay cash." Variety panned Ichabod and Me in its October 4, 1961, issue as "just another run-of-the-mill situation comedy, typically innocuous in its content and wholly bland in its approach...there were no surprises and few laughs on its first outing."

Ichabod and Me struggled to attract an audience. Rod Serling's guest appearance drew some attention to the series in March 1962, but did not improve its ratings, and by April 1962 Robert Sterling was acknowledging in interviews that the show was unlikely to return for a second season. He expressed bewilderment at the rules of television, likened an actor's selection of a television role to little more than gambling, with success having nothing to do with the role's quality, and criticized sponsors for becoming too prone to withdraw support for a television series at the first sign of early weakness in viewership. Disgusted with the television industry after the cancellation of Ichabod and Me, Sterling made only sporadic television appearances after the series came to an end in mid-1962.

Broadcast history
The pilot for Ichabod and Me aired on April 24, 1960, as an episode of General Electric Theater entitled "Adam's Apples." Ichabod and Me premiered as a regular series on September 26, 1961, and aired on CBS on Tuesdays at 9:30 p.m. Eastern Time. The competition for Ichabod and Me was not considered formidable: It consisted of the second half of the Leslie Nielsen police drama The New Breed on ABC until November 14, 1961, when The New Breed moved to 8:30 pm. Eastern Time and Bert Parks's game show Yours for a Song began airing at 9:30 pm. Eastern on ABC, while on NBC Ichabod and Me aired opposite the second half of The Dick Powell Show, an anthology series. However, CBS cancelled Ichabod and Me after only a single season, and its 36th and final new episode was broadcast on June 5, 1962. Reruns of the show then aired in its regular time slot until September 18, 1962.

Episodes
Tucker, pp. 69–70, 72.Television listing, The La Crosse Tribune (La Crosse, Wisconsin), April 24, 1960, p. 32.Television listing, The Bridgeport Post (Bridgeport, Connecticut), September 26, 1961, p. 26."Television Highlights," The Schenectady Gazette, October 17, 1961, p. 13.Television listing, The Boston Globe (Boston, Massachusetts), November 7, 1961, p. 21.Television listing, Latrobe Bulletin (Latrobe, Pennsylvania), November 14, 1961, p. 7.Television listing, The Capital Times (Madison, Wisconsin), December 5, 1961, p. 31.Television listing, The Times Record (Troy, New York), December 5, 1961, p. 6.Television listing, Orlando Evening Star (Orlando, Florida), December 19, 1961, p. 18."Television Highlights," The Schenectady Gazette, January 9, 1962, p. 18."Television Highlights," The Schenectady Gazette, January 16, 1962, p. 19."Television Highlights," The Schenectady Gazette, March, 1962, p. 13.DuBrow, Rick, "Rod Sserling Says Hello and Goodbye As Actor," The Press Democrat (Santa Rosa, California), March 21, 1962, p. 40.Television listing, The Pittsburgh Press (Pittsburgh, Pennsylvania), April 3, 1962, p. 45.Television listing, The Palm Beach Post (West Palm Beach, Florida), April 15, 1962, p. 78.Television listing, The Pocono Record (Stroudsburg, Pennsylvania), April 24, 1962, p. 9.Television listing, The Post-Standard (Syracuse, New York), May 8, 1962, p. 16.Television listing, The Miami News(Miami, Florida), May 8, 1962, p. 12.Television listing, The Indianapolis Star (Indianapolis, Indiana), May 15, 1962, p. 15.Television listing, The Times Record (Troy, New York), May 22, 1962, p. 4.

Pilot: "Adam's Apples"

Ichabod and Me

References

Footnotes

Bibliography
Brooks, Tim, and Earle Marsh, The Complete Directory to Prime-Time Network and Cable TV Shows, 1946–present (Sixth Edition), New York: Ballantine Books, 1995, .
 Lesczak, Bob. Single Season Sitcoms, 1948–1979: A Complete Guide. Jefferson, North Carolina: McFarland and Company, 2012. .
 McNeil, Alex, Total Television: The Comprehensive Guide to Programming From 1948 to the Present, Fourth Edition, New York: Penguin Books, 1996, .
 Tucker, David C. Lost Laughs of ′50s and ′60s Television: Thirty Sitcoms That Faded Off Screen. Jefferson, North Carolina: McFarland and Company, 2010. .

External links 

 
 Ichabod and Me opening credits on YouTube
 Ichabod and Me opening and closing themes on YouTube
 Main Theme from Ichabod and Me on YouTube
 Main Theme from Ichabod and Me on YouTube
 Excerpt from Ichabod and Me episode "Bob's Redhead" on YouTube
 Ichabod and Me episode "The Celebrity" on YouTube
 Ichabod and Me episode "Bob's Award" on YouTube

1961 American television series debuts
1962 American television series endings
1960s American sitcoms
1960s American workplace comedy television series
CBS original programming
English-language television shows
Television series by Universal Television
Black-and-white American television shows
Television series about journalism
Television shows set in New Hampshire